Julien Bahain (born 20 April 1986, in Angers) is a rower of French/Canadian origin. He competed at the 2008 Summer Olympics, where he won a bronze medal in the quadruple sculls with Jonathan Coeffic, Pierre-Jean Peltier and Cédric Berrest. In 2014 he decided to retire from French rowing team to row with Canada.

In June 2016, he was officially named to Canada's 2016 Olympic team.

References

External links
 Bio on results.beijing2008.cn

Living people
1986 births
French male rowers
Olympic bronze medalists for France
Olympic rowers of France
Rowers at the 2008 Summer Olympics
Rowers at the 2012 Summer Olympics
Olympic medalists in rowing
Medalists at the 2008 Summer Olympics
Rowers at the 2015 Pan American Games
World Rowing Championships medalists for France
Pan American Games gold medalists for Canada
Rowers at the 2016 Summer Olympics
Olympic rowers of Canada
Pan American Games medalists in rowing
European Rowing Championships medalists
Medalists at the 2015 Pan American Games